DaShon Lamor Polk (born March 13, 1977) is a former American football linebacker in the National Football League.  He played professionally for the Buffalo Bills and Houston Texans.

Early life
Polk was born in Pacoima, California and attended Taft High School where he was selected for All-City. Polk played college football at the University of Arizona and was a three-year starter.

Professional career
Polk was drafted by the Buffalo Bills in the seventh round (251st pick overall) in the 2000 NFL Draft. He played for the Bills from 2000 to 2003, before playing for the Houston Texans from 2004 to 2006. Polk played seven seasons, accumulating 224 tackles, 4.5 sacks, and two forced fumbles, in the NFL before retiring.
Now Dashon L. Polk has retired (2007). He has a wife of 17 years and 3 children (two twins that attend Ridge Point High School.) Dashon Polk II, Trinity Polk, and Cherish Polk.

References

External links
 
Los Angeles Times: DaShon Polk

1977 births
Living people
American football linebackers
Buffalo Bills players
Houston Texans players
Arizona Wildcats football players
William Howard Taft Charter High School alumni